Rock and Roller Queens (RRQ) is a roller derby league based in Bogotá, Colombia.  Founded in 2009, the league consists of two teams, which compete against teams from other leagues. Rock and Roller Queens is a member of the Women's Flat Track Derby Association (WFTDA).

History
The league was founded in December 2009 by María Paola Hernandez, a local graphic designer with experience of roller skating, after she saw the movie Whip It.  By late 2011, the league was one of about ten in the country, and the sport was recognised by Colombian Sports Federation.

The league won the first roller derby tournament in Colombia, which was contested by eight teams, in June 2012. In July, it was accepted as the first member of the Women's Flat Track Derby Association Apprentice Programme from South America, and it became a full member of the WFTDA in June 2013.

WFTDA rankings

References

Sport in Bogotá
Roller derby leagues established in 2009
Roller derby leagues
Roller derby in Colombia
Women's Flat Track Derby Association Division 3
2009 establishments in Colombia